Totally Hits 2004 is an album in the Totally Hits series. This was the third and final album not to contain a Billboard Hot 100 number-one hit.

Track listing
Jet - "Are You Gonna Be My Girl" (3:37)
Maroon 5 - "Harder to Breathe" (2:55)
Jason Mraz - "You and I Both" (3:37)
Kelis - "Milkshake" (3:08)
Sean Paul featuring Sasha - "I'm Still in Love with You" (3:34)
Ying Yang Twins featuring Lil Jon and the East Side Boyz - "Salt Shaker" (4:10)
J-Kwon - "Tipsy" (3:58)
T.I. - "Rubberband Man" (4:38)
Alicia Keys - "You Don't Know My Name" (4:29)
Christina Aguilera - "The Voice Within" (4:26)
Ruben Studdard - "Sorry 2004" (4:21)
Justin Timberlake - "I'm Lovin' It" (3:40)
Kelly Clarkson - "The Trouble with Love Is" (3:41)
Dido - "White Flag" (3:37)
Clay Aiken -  "Invisible" (4:04)
Simple Plan - "Perfect" (4:40)
Michelle Branch - "Breathe" (3:30)
R. Kelly - "Step in the Name of Love" (Remix) (5:10)
Joe - "More & More" (3:46)
Missy Elliott - "Pass That Dutch" (3:43)

Certifications

References

Totally Hits
2004 compilation albums